James N. Folks (October 19, 1897 – January 20, 2001) was American politician in the state of Michigan. He served in the Michigan House of Representatives from 1955 to 1972, representing the 2nd district (Jackson County) as a Republican.

References

Republican Party members of the Michigan House of Representatives
1897 births
2001 deaths
20th-century American politicians